Wichian Buri is a district (amphoe) in southern part of Phetchabun province, northern Thailand.

History
In the past the area of Wichian Buri was administered by Mueang Tha Rong. King Rama III upgraded the status of Tha Rong city by amalgamating Bua Chum and Chai Badan and changed the city name to be Wichian Buri. When King Rama V created Monthon Phetchabun, Wichian Buri became a subordinate of Phetchabun in 1898. The name of the district was changed to Tha Rong on 17 April 1939, but changed back to Wichian Buri in 1944.

Geography
Neighboring districts are (from the north clockwise) Bueng Sam Phan of Phetchabun Province, Phakdi Chumphon and Thep Sathit of Chaiyaphum province, Si Thep of Phetchabun, and Phaisali of Nakhon Sawan province.

Climate

Administration

Central administration 
Wichian Buri is divided into 14 sub-districts (tambons), which are further subdivided into 192 administrative villages (mubans).

Local administration 
There is one town (thesaban mueang) in the district:
 Wichian Buri consisting of parts of sub-districts Tha Rong and Sa Pradu.

There is one sub-district municipality (thesaban tambon) in the district:
 Phu Toei consisting of parts of sub-district Phu Toei.

There are 14 sub-district administrative organizations (SAO) in the district:
 Tha Rong consisting of parts of sub-district Tha Rong.
 Sa Pradu consisting of parts of sub-district Sa Pradu.
 Sam Yaek consisting of sub-district Sam Yaek.
 Khok Prong consisting of sub-district Khok Prong.
 Nam Ron consisting of sub-district Nam Ron.
 Bo Rang consisting of sub-district Bo Rang.
 Phu Toei consisting of parts of sub-district Phu Toei.
 Phu Kham consisting of sub-district Phu Kham.
 Phu Nam Yot consisting of sub-district Phu Nam Yot.
 Sap Sombun consisting of sub-district Sap Sombun.
 Bueng Krachap consisting of sub-district Bueng Krachap.
 Wang Yai consisting of sub-district Wang Yai.
 Yang Sao consisting of sub-district Yang Sao.
 Sap Noi consisting of sub-district Sap Noi.

Wichian Buri grilled chicken  
Wichian Buri grilled chicken is a chicken dish from the Wichian Buri District. It is unique because it is made with Phetchabun regional ingredients, like a tamarind sauce and pickled garlic. The salty roasted chicken is sold at restaurants and street food stalls and often served with papaya salad and rice.

There are two types of chicken used for grilling; backyard chickens (kai ban; ไก่บ้าน) and broilers (kai nuea; ไก่เนื้อ). The chicken is marinated overnight in the refrigerator or over ice in a plastic bag with garlic, fish sauce, salt, pepper, coriander sauces. Then, it is cooked. The grilled chicken sauce is sweet, sour, and salty. The main and secret ingredients for this sauce are sugar, tamarind, garlic, chili powder, and salt.

Thai Airways International named one of its airplanes Wichian Buri for the district's grilled chicken prowess.

See also
 Kai yang
 Street food of Thailand

References

External links
amphoe.com

Wichian Buri